Yevgeniy Pavlov (born 28 September 1999) is a Kazakh professional boxer, who has held the WBA International super bantamweight title since 2021.

Professional boxing career
Pavlov made his professional debut against Patrik Renato Horvath on 26 July 2020. He won the fight by a second-round knockout. Pavlov next faced Goodluck Mrema on 31 October 2020. He once again won the fight by a second-round stoppage. Pavlov faced Alie Laurel on 16 December 2020, in his final fight of the year. He won the fight by unanimous decision, the first one of his professional career, with scores of 60–53, 60-53 and 60–54.

Pavlov was booked to face Nasibu Ramadhani on 20 May 2021, in his first fight of the year. He won the fight by a fifth-round knockout. Pavlov fought the experienced Isaac Sackey for the vacant WBA International super bantamweight title on 12 September 2021. He won the fight by a fourth-round technical knockout. Pavlov was next booked to face Edixon Perez in a non-title bout on 24 December 2021. He won the fight by unanimous decision, with all three judges awarding him an 80-72 scorecard.

Pavlov faced Alexis Salido on 4 June 2022, in his first fight of the year. He won the bout by a second-round technical knockout.

Professional boxing record

References

Living people
1999 births
Kazakhstani male boxers
People from Petropavlovsk-Kamchatsky
Super-bantamweight boxers
People from Petropavl
Kazakhstani people of Russian descent
21st-century Kazakhstani people